Raymond Charles Barrett (2 May 19278 September 2009) was an Australian actor. During the 1960s, he was a leading actor on British television, where he was best known for his appearances in The Troubleshooters (1965–1971). From the 1970s, he appeared in lead and character roles in Australian films and TV series.

Early life
Barrett was born in Brisbane, Queensland and was educated at Windsor State Primary School and at Brisbane State High School. Fascinated by radio from an early age, he won an on-air talent competition in 1939, at the age of 12: an eisteddfod that was broadcast on 4BH radio, with a musical monologue about a dog called "Paddy". This was to place him on a path different from his dream of becoming a boatbuilder. In 1949, Barrett was initiated into Freemasonry as an initiate and member of Empire Lodge #197 of the United Grand Lodge of Queensland.

Acting career

United Kingdom
Ray Barrett first appeared on radio in Brisbane, and later in Sydney, to where he moved in 1954. In 1957, he moved to Britain, where his background as a singer earned him a part in a revue alongside Beryl Reid, Patrick Wymark and Sheila Hancock.

Owing to his "tough looks", Barrett was given character and "tough guy" roles from an unusually young age. In Britain, he played one of the lead roles in the TV series Emergency – Ward 10 and later one of the main characters, the hard-nosed oil worker Peter Thornton, in the long-running BBC series The Troubleshooters. He mostly appeared in television but also made several films including Hammer's The Reptile (1966).

He also voiced characters in Gerry Anderson-produced "Supermarionation" series of the 1960s: Stingray (1964–65), as Commander Shore and Titan, and Thunderbirds (1965–66) as John Tracy, the Hood and various extras. Also in 1965, he appeared as Bennett/Koquillion in the Doctor Who serial The Rescue.

Australia
In later years, Barrett starred in film and TV roles in his native Australia, living on Stradbroke Island, Queensland during the 1970s. He appeared as the Prime Minister (a character who is assassinated) in Burn the Butterflies, and as a miner in Golden Soak. In 1980, he played the part of the controversial Australian historical figure Governor Bligh in the ABC Television production The Timeless Land. He had secondary roles in many other productions, including Something in the Air.

Barrett also appeared in such films as Don's Party and The Carmakers (about the 1973 release of the Leyland P76 car, co-starring Noel Ferrier and Nick Tate). In 2005, he received an Australian Film Institute Longford Life Achievement Award.

Death
Barrett died on 8 September 2009 at the Gold Coast Hospital in Southport, Queensland, aged 82, after suffering a brain haemorrhage. His final acting appearance had been in the 2008 film Australia. He was married three times, and left three children. His death occurred four months after the passing of Thunderbirds co-star Bud Tingwell.

Filmography

Film

 The Desperate Women (1954) as Agent
 The Sundowners (1960) (uncredited)
 Touch of Death (1961) as Maxwell
 Edgar Wallace Mysteries: "Time to Remember" (1962) as Sammy (US TV: Edgar Wallace Mystery Theatre)
 Mix Me a Person (1962) as Insp. Wagstaffe
 Jigsaw (1962) as Sgt. Gorman
 Moment of Decision (1962) (Third episode in the Scales of Justice series)
 Edgar Wallace Mysteries: "To Have and to Hold" (1963) as Henry Fraser (US TV: Edgar Wallace Mystery Theatre)
 80,000 Suspects (1963) as Health Inspector Bennett
 Valley of the Kings (1964) as Mr. Marsh
 The Reptile (1966) as Harry George Spalding
 Thunderbirds Are GO (1966) as John Tracy / The Hood (voice)
 Just Like a Woman (1967) as Australian
 Revenge (1971) as Harry
 Peer Gynt (1972) as Button moulder
 Little Laura and Big John (1973) as Cates
 The Amorous Milkman (1975) as John
 The Hostages (1975) as Joe Blake
 Arena (1976) as Col Burrows
 Don's Party (1976) as Mal
 Let the Balloon Go (1976) as Dr. McLeod
 No Room to Run (1978) as Jack Deakin
 The Chant of Jimmie Blacksmith (1978) as Farrell
 Tim (1979) as Man outside hotel (uncredited)
 The Earthling (1980) as Parnell
 Departmental (1980)
 A Shifting Dreaming (1982) 
 A Dangerous Summer (1982) as F.C.O. Webster
 Goodbye Paradise (1983) as Michael Stacy
 Where the Green Ants Dream (1984) as Cole
 Conferenceville (1984) 
 The Empty Beach (1985) as MacLeary
 Rebel (1985) as Bubbles
 Relatives (1985) as Geoffrey
 Frenchman's Farm (1987) as Harry Benson
 Contagion (1987) as Bael
 As Time Goes By (1988) as J.L. Weston
 Prisoners of the Sun (1990) as President of the Bench
 Waiting (1991) as Frank
 No Worries (1994) as Old Burkey
 Hotel Sorrento (1995) as Wal Moynihan
 Dad and Dave: On Our Selection (1995) as Dwyer
 Asian Connection: Old Flames (1995)
 Brilliant Lies (1996) as Brian Connor
 Hotel de Love (1996) as Jack Dunne
 Heaven's Burning (1997) as Cam
 In the Winter Dark (1998) as Maurice Stubbs
 Deluge (1999)
 Dalkeith (2002) as Tarquin St John Smythe
 Visitors (2003) as Bill Perry
 Australia (2008) as Ramsden (final film role)

Television

 The Adventures of Long John Silver (1957) as Paul
 Educating Archie (1959) as Ray
 Armchair Mystery Theatre (1960) as Detective-Sergeant Cullen
 Armchair Theatre (1960–1962) as Alan Whint / Donnie / Ben
 Emergency – Ward 10 (1960–61) as Dr. Don Nolan
 Out of This World (1962) as Dr. Alan Whint
 Man of the World (1962) as Charlie West
 The Avengers (1963) as Strong 
 Z Cars (1963) as Len Wilson
 ITV Playhouse (1963) as Larry Ransome
 First Night (1963) as Frank Angelo
 ITV Play of the Week (1963–64) as Sergeant Weston / Jack Bailey
 Ghost Squad (1963–64) as Peter Clarke / Mr. Hicks
 The Saint (1964) as Willie Kinsall
 The Brothers Karamazov (1964–65) as Mitya Karamazov
 Doctor Who (1965) as Bennett / Koquillion
 Thursday Theatre (1965) as Jacko
 Stingray (1964–65) as Commander Sam Shore / Sub-Lieutenant John Horatio Fisher / King Titan (voice)
 Drama 61–67 (1962–1965) as Captain Murchison
 BBC Play of the Month (1965) as Knight
 Blackmail (1965) as Patek
 Gideon C.I.D. (1965)
 No Hiding Place (1963–1965) as Johnny Crown / Larry Hobbs
 The Spies (1966) as Walker
 The Man in Room 17 (1966) as Al Gover
 Thunderbirds (1965–66) as John Tracy / The Hood / Lieutenant Burroughs / Various Characters (voice)
 Till Death Us Do Part (1967) 
 The Corbett Follies (1969)
 Mogul (1965–1972) as Peter Thornton
 Public Eye (1972) as Melville Hayden-Peters
 Barlow at Large (1974) as Johnny Duchene 
 The Adventures of Black Beauty (1974) as T. Otis Waygood
 Dixon of Dock Green (1964–1974) as Phil Burgh / Nat Singer
 Colditz (1974) as Flt. Lt. Jack Collins
 The Double Dealers (1974) as Geoffrey Burch
 Churchill's People (1975) as Leo Hennessey
 The Outsiders (1976) as Harry
 Run from the Morning (1978)
 Golden Soak (1979) as Alec Hamilton
 Burn the Butterflies (1979) as Prime Minister
 The Timeless Land (1980) as Gov. Bligh
 Levkas Man (1981)
 Sporting Chance (1981) as Robbo
 The Last Bastion (1984) as Gen. Tom Blamey
 Five Mile Creek (1984) as Harry
 Waterfront (1984) as Sam Elliott
 The Flying Doctors (1986) as Frank Watson
 Tusitala (1986) as Harry Moors
 The Challenge (1986) as Robert McCullough
 G.P. (1989) as Rex Mitchell
 The Paper Man (1990) as Maurice Grimm
 Correlli (1995) as Harry Powell
 Bordertown (1995) as Colonel Forsythe
 Fire (1996) as Charles
 Adrenaline Junkies (1997)
 Something in the Air (2000) as Len Taylor
 Stingers (2000) as Mr. Rafferty
 White Collar Blue (2003) as Barry Hill
 After the Deluge (2003) as Old Cliff Kirby
 All Saints (2004) as Doc Connelly

References

External links
 
 Ray Barrett at the National Film and Sound Archive
 Obituary in The Daily Telegraph
 Obituary in The Independent

1927 births
2009 deaths
20th-century Australian male actors
21st-century Australian male actors
Australian expatriate actors
Australian expatriates in the United Kingdom
Australian Freemasons
Australian male film actors
Australian male radio actors
Australian male television actors
Australian male voice actors
Best Actor AACTA Award winners
Best Supporting Actor AACTA Award winners
Logie Award winners
Male actors from Brisbane
Male actors from Sydney
Neurological disease deaths in Queensland
People educated at Brisbane State High School
People from Queensland